Jalan Gunung Ulu Kali, Federal Route 433, is a federal road in Genting Highlands, Pahang, Malaysia.

The Kilometre Zero is located at Mushroom Park roundabout.

At most sections, the Federal Route 433 was built under the JKR R5 road standard, with a speed limit of 90 km/h.

List of junctions

Malaysian Federal Roads
Genting Highlands